Bear Creek (also known as "Big Bear Creek") is a  tributary of Loyalsock Creek in Lycoming County, Pennsylvania, in the United States.

See also
List of rivers of Pennsylvania

References

Rivers of Pennsylvania
Tributaries of Loyalsock Creek
Rivers of Lycoming County, Pennsylvania